Upper Arun is a  biological Site of Special Scientific Interest between Billingshurst and Pulborough in West Sussex.

It is an outstanding site for breeding dragonflies, including the clubtail, hairy, brilliant emerald and the nationally rare scarce chaser.

References

Sites of Special Scientific Interest in West Sussex